Cyperus holoschoenus is a sedge of the family Cyperaceae that is native to New Guinea and parts of northern Australia.

The plant blooms between April and August, producing green-brown flowers.

It is found in seasonally dry tropical areas in New Guinea, Queensland and the Northern Territory. In Western Australia it is found alongside creeks and rivers and in pools in the Kimberley region where it grows in sandy-clay soils.

See also
List of Cyperus species

References

Plants described in 1810
Flora of Western Australia
Flora of New Guinea
Flora of the Northern Territory
Flora of Queensland
holoschoenus
Taxa named by Robert Brown (botanist, born 1773)